Takten Hermitage is a historical hermitage, belonging to Sera Monastery. It is located north of Lhasa in Tibet.

Footnotes
The Tibetan and Himalayan Library

Buddhist hermitages in Lhasa
Sera Monastery